Gigi Foster is a U.S born academic and economist. She is currently a professor of economics at the University of New South Wales.

She regularly appears in the Australian media on the topic of economics, having been a panellist on discussion television show Q&A and host of a radio show on the ABC.

Education 
Foster received a Bachelor of Arts (Ethics, Politics, and Economics) from Yale University, and completed a PhD in economics at the University of Maryland.

Career

Podcast 
Foster hosts The Economists on the ABC with Australian economics journalist Peter Martin.

COVID-19 
Foster attracted criticism over her stance to Australia's response to the COVID-19 pandemic. In particular, she criticised the COVID Zero-centred approach adopted by Victoria and other jurisdictions within Australia, believing that the costs to the economy outweighed the potential benefits of reducing case numbers. Her then-employer the University of New South Wales distanced themselves from her comments which were televised during the show Q&A.

Accomplishments 
Gigi Foster was named Young Economist of The Year for 2019 by the Economics Society of Australia.

Publications 

 Coelli, M., Foster, G. and Leigh, A. (2018), Do School Principals Respond to Increased Public Scrutiny? New Survey Evidence from Australia. Econ Rec, 94: 73-101. doi.org/10.1111/1475-4932.12400
 Foster G, 2019, Biophysical measurement in experimental social science research: Theory and practice, doi.org/10.1016/C2016-0-04236-5
 Frijters P;  Foster G, 2013, An Economic Theory of Greed, Love, Groups, and Networks, Cambridge University Press, doi.org/10.1017/CBO9781139207041
 Foster G, 2019, 'Conclusion',  in Biophysical Measurement in Experimental Social Science Research: Theory and Practice,  pp.267 – 277, doi.org/10.1016/B978-0-12-813092-6.00010-1
 Foster G;  Frijters P, 2017, 'Behavioral Political Economy',  in Routledge Handbook of Behavioral Economics, Routledge,  pp.348 – 364, doi.org/10.4324/9781315743479
 Kalenkoski CM;  Foster G, 2016, 'Introduction: The Economics of Multitasking',  in The Economics of Multitasking, Palgrave Macmillan US,  pp.1 – 5, doi.org/10.1057/9781137381446_1
 Foster G, 2016, 'Grading Standards in Higher Education:  Trends, Context, and Prognosis',  in Bretag T (ed.), Handbook of Academic Integrity, Springer,  pp.307 – 324, doi.org/10.1007/978-981-287-098-8_48
 Kalenkoski CM;  Foster G, 2016, 'Discussion: The economics of multitasking',  in Kalenkoski C;  Foster G (ed.), The Economics of Multitasking, Palgrave Macmillan,  pp.203 – 208, doi.org/10.1057/9781137381446
 Foster G, 2015, 'Experimental Economics',  in Wright J (ed.), International Encyclopedia of the Social & Behavioral Sciences, Elsevier,  pp.546 – 551, doi.org/10.1016/B978-0-08-097086-8.71052-X
 Foster G, 2015, 'Grading Standards in Higher Education: Trends, Context, and Prognosis', Handbook of Academic Integrity, Springer Singapore,  pp.1 – 14, doi.org/10.1007/978-981-287-079-7_48-2
 Frijters P;  Foster G, 'Is it rational to be in love?',  in, Edward Elgar Publishing,  pp. 205 – 232, doi.org/10.4337/9781782549598.00020

References 

Living people
Australian women economists
Year of birth missing (living people)
University of New South Wales people
Yale College alumni
University of Maryland, Baltimore alumni